When The Good Times Come is the second studio album by British melodic rock band Hard Rain. It was released in 1999 on Eagle Records.

Bob Catley has stated that unlike Hard Rain's debut album, When The Good Times Come was stylistically different from anything they would have recorded as Magnum.

Track listing
All Tracks written by Tony Clarkin.

"Eat It Up"
"Who You Gonna Trust"
"Rock Me In Ya Cradle"
"No One Can Show You The Way"
"When The Good Times Come"
"Talks Like A Lady"
"An Ordinary Day"
"Showtime"
"Lightnin' Strikes"
"Never Say Never"
"Step Back"

Personnel
Tony Clarkin — Guitar
Bob Catley — Vocals
Sue McCloskey — Vocals
Paul Hodson — Keyboards
Al Barrow — Bass
Rob Barrow — Drums

Additional musicians

Brian Bannister (musician) — Harmonica on "Eat It Up"

Additional instruments on "Showtime":
Justin Tundervary — Trumpet
Gary Barnacle — Saxophone
Andy "Freddy" Rogers — Trombone

Choir on "No One Can Show You The Way":
Bob Catley — Vocals
Sue McCloskey — Vocals
Paul Hodson — Vocals
Al Barrow — Vocals
Rob Barrow — Vocals
Sue Parkes — Vocals
Anita Barrow — Vocals
John Hampton (musician) — Vocals
Nikki Hall — Vocals

Production
Recorded and Mixed at Mad Hat Studios, Walsall, United Kingdom
Produced Tony Clarkin
Engineered and Mixed by Mike Cowling
Mastered and Edited at Hatch Farm Studios, Addlestone, Surrey by Nick Smith
Additional Mastering at Mad Hat Studios, Walsall by Claire Swan and Mark Stuart

References

External links
 www.magnumonline.co.uk - Official Magnum site

1999 albums
Albums produced by Tony Clarkin
Hard Rain (band) albums